Clay Township is one of fourteen townships in Cass County, Indiana, United States, and one of the seventeen townships sharing the name in the state. As of the 2010 census, its population was 2,817.

History
Clay Township was organized in 1832. It was named for Henry Clay, three-term Speaker of the House of Representatives and Secretary of State.

Thompson Barnett House was listed on the National Register of Historic Places in 1986.

Geography

Cities and towns
 Logansport (northeast edge)

Unincorporated towns
 Adamsboro

Adjacent townships
 Bethlehem (north)
 Adams (northeast)
 Miami (east)
 Eel (southwest)
 Noble (west)
 Harrison (northwest)

Major highways
  Indiana State Road 25

Cemeteries
The township contains two cemeteries: Bethel and Wilson.

References
 
 United States Census Bureau cartographic boundary files

External links

Townships in Cass County, Indiana
Townships in Indiana
Populated places established in 1832
1832 establishments in Indiana